Unreal is the first mini-album released by Japanese rock band flumpool on November 19, 2008. Its cover is a nude photography, describing the band's members as "dolls". It was certified Platinum by the Recording Industry Association of Japan (RIAJ) for shipment of 250,000 copies.

Track listing

Charts

References

2008 albums
Flumpool albums
A-Sketch albums